Barry Stagg (born April 9, 1944) is a Canadian musician and playwright and from Montreal.  He graduated from the Université de Montréal, and recently moved to North Carolina from Nova Scotia.

Life and works 
Stagg was born April 9, 1944 in Montreal and spent the first 29 years of his life in the city. Stagg has written and recorded songs for Gamma Records, United Artists, London Records and RCA. He has written film scores for documentaries, as well as numerous mini-operas. He is well known for his world hit song "To Love Means to be Free" which was released on his Green and Stagg album in 1969 that won the Canadian Business Music Industry writing award. From 1989–present, playwright-in-residence for the Nosco Academy of Theatre Arts. During that time over 60 musicals were written and composed, covering a wide range of themes.

From 2002 to 2003 Stagg was commissioned to write a 16 piece musical composition with lyrics entitled "Psalms from the Ark" for the ballet company centered at The Dance Center of Spruce Pine of North Carolina. In late 2004 he released the album Slaughterhouse of Love. 

Stagg's most recent album No More Mountains to Cross was released in 2009.  A CD release party was held at the Carolina Theater in Spruce Pine, North Carolina, July 11, 2009.

Discography

Albums

Singles

References 
 Green & Stagg, Canadian Pop Encyclopedia.
 Tony Green/Barry Stagg- Green/Stagg

Specific

1944 births
Living people
Place of birth missing (living people)
Université de Montréal alumni
Canadian expatriate musicians in the United States
Canadian songwriters
Musicians from Montreal
Writers from Montreal